Byron Sigcho-Lopez (born July 7, 1983) is a Chicago politician and community activist. He is the alderman of Chicago's 25th ward, having taken office as a member of the Chicago City Council in May 2019. He won an open race to succeed outgoing alderman Daniel Solis in the 2019 Chicago aldermanic election. He is a member of the Democratic Socialists of America. He was elected as 25th Ward Democratic Committeeperson in 2020.

Early life and education
Sigcho-Lopez was born and raised in Quito, Ecuador. Sigcho-Lopez earned a bachelor's degree in Business Administration and Mathematics from Cumberland University in Tennessee, and a Master's in Economics from the University of Illinois at Chicago. He is pursuing a PhD in Policy Studies in Urban Education from the University of Illinois at Chicago.

Political career
Sigcho-Lopez unsuccessfully challenged Danny Solis in the 2015 Chicago 25th Ward aldermanic election.

In 2019, Sigcho-Lopez was elected to succeed outgoing 25th Ward alderman Danny Solis.

On April 10, 2019, prior to being sworn in, Sigcho-Lopez joined six other newly elected members of the City Council in protesting against the approval of tax increment financing for the Lincoln Yards and The 78 real estate developments.

Sigcho-Lopez assumed office May 20, 2019.

On June 12, 2019, Sigcho-Lopez demanded a review of all permits and licenses approved by disgraced former Alderman Danny Solis.

In November 2019, Sigcho-Lopez was one of eleven aldermen to vote against Mayor Lori Lightfoot's first budget. He joined all five other members of the Socialist Caucus in signing a letter to Lightfoot which criticized her budget for "an over-reliance on property taxes" and "regressive funding models" that are "burdensome to our working-class citizens, while giving the wealthy and large corporations a pass."

Personal life
Sigcho-Lopez is married to Loreen Targos. In June 2022, Sigcho-Lopez and Targos became parents to triplets.

See also
List of Chicago aldermen since 1923
List of Democratic Socialists of America who have held office in the United States

References

External links 
Official campaign website

1983 births
21st-century American politicians
American politicians of Ecuadorian descent
Hispanic and Latino American politicians
Chicago City Council members
Ecuadorian emigrants to the United States
Living people
Democratic Socialists of America politicians from Illinois